Febiana was city and former bishopric in Roman North Africa, which only remains a Latin Catholic titular see.

History 
Febina, in present-day Tunisia, was among the many cities of sufficient importance in the Roman province of Byzacena, in the papal sway, to become a suffragan diocese of the Metropolitan of Carthage, but was to fade so completely its remains weren’t found, plausibly at the seventh century advent of Islam.

Two of its bishops are historically documented :
 Successianus intervened at the Council of Carthage called in 484 by king Huneric of the Vandal Kingdom and was afterwards exiled, like most Catholic bishops, unlike their schismatic Donatist (heretical) counterparts (none reported for Febiana) 
 Sallustius participated in a Council of Carthage in 641 against the heresy monothelitism.

Titular see
The diocese was nominally restored in 1933  as Latin titular bishopric of Febiana (Latin = Curiate  Italian) / Febianen(sis) (Latin adjective)
It is vacant, having had the following incumbents, of the fitting episcopal (lowest) rank, with an archiepiscopal exception :
 Laurean Rugambwa (1951.12.13 – 1953.03.25) as only Apostolic Vicar of Lower Kagera (Tanzania) (1951.12.13 – 1953.03.25); next (see) promoted only Bishop of Rutabo (1953.03.25 – 1960.06.21 see suppressed as titular bishopric), created Cardinal-Priest of S. Francesco d’Assisi a Ripa Grande (1960.03.31 – death 1997.12.08), first Bishop of successor bishopric Bukoba (Tanzania) (1960.06.21 – 1968.12.19), Metropolitan Archbishop of Dar-es-Salaam (Tanzania) (1968.12.19 – 1992.07.22), President of Association of Member Episcopal Conferences in Eastern Africa (1970 – 1974)
 António De Campos (1954.08.28 – death 1969.08.09) as Auxiliary Bishop of Latin Patriarchate of Lisboa (Portugal) (1954.08.28 – 1969.08.09)
Titular Archbishop: Antonio Guízar y Valencia  (1969.08.24 – death 1971.08.04) as emeritate; previously last Bishop of Chihuahua (Mexico) (1920.07.20 – 1958.11.22), (see) promoted first Metropolitan Archbishop of Chihuahua (Mexico) (1958.11.22 – retired 1969.08.24)

 José Ruiseco Vieira (1971.12.10 – 1977.03.28)
 François Jacques Bussini (1977.12.12 – 1985.12.28)
 Mario Luis Bautista Maulión (1986.03.21 – 1995.05.08)
 Antal Majnek, Friars Minor (O.F.M.) (1995.12.09 – 2002.03.27)
 Marian Buczek (2002.05.04 – 2007.07.16)
 János Székely (2007.11.14 – 2017.06.18) as Auxiliary Bishop of Archdiocese Esztergom–Budapest (Hungary) (2007.11.14 – 2017.06.18); next Bishop of Szombathely (Hungary) (2017.06.18 – ...).

See also 
 List of Catholic dioceses in Tunisia

Catholic titular sees in Africa
Suppressed Roman Catholic dioceses